Show and tell is the practice of showing something to an audience and describing it to them.

Show and tell may also refer to:

Film and television
 Show & Tell, a 1998 film featuring Marin Hinkle
 Show & Tell (talk show), a 1990s Philippine TV series
 Show and Tell, a 2011 British TV comedy chat show hosted by Chris Addison
 "Show and Tell" (Stargate SG-1), a TV episode
 "Show and Tell" (2 Stupid Dogs), a TV episode

Music 
 Show and Tell (The Birthday Massacre album), 2009
 Show and Tell (Silvertide album), 2004
 Show and Tell (Al Wilson album), 1973
 "Show and Tell" (song), written by Jerry Fuller and first recorded by Johnny Mathis in 1972, also covered by various artists
 "Show & Tell", a song by Cherish from the 2006 album Unappreciated
 "Show & Tell", a song by Burna Boy from the 2019 album African Giant
 "Show & Tell", a song by Melanie Martinez from the 2019 album K-12

Other uses
 Show and Tell, a play by Anthony Clarvoe
 Show and Tell, a 1991 children's book by Robert Munsch
 Show'N Tell, a 1960s/70s record-playing toy

See also
 
 
 Show, don't tell, a writing technique